Latur is one of the many educational hubs in Maharashtra.

Schools

Central Board of Secondary Education (CBSE Affiliated) 

 Sant Tukaram National Model School, Latur

 Podar International School, Latur
 Christ International School
 Global Knowledge Public School, Latur
 Hizon discovery academy
 Jaihind School Udgir
 Jawahar Navodaya Vidhyalaya Latur
 Kendriya vidyalaya
 Raja Narayanlal Lahoti English School, Latur
 Sharada International School
 Smt. Prayag Karad English Medium High school,
 Swami Vivekanand Integration English School, Latur
 Shri Bankatlal lahoti English School, Latur
 MDA Royal International School, MDA Educational Campus, Kolpa, Tq & Dist Latur

Indian Certificate of Secondary Education 
 Goldcrest High International School, Latur

Maharashtra State Board of Secondary and Higher Secondary Education
• Saraswati Vidyalay, Prakash Nagar, Latur
 Baswanappa Wale New English Medium School, Latur
 Shri Shanti Niketan English School Latur
 Kripa Sadan Convent School
 Shri Deshikendra Vidyalaya, Latur 
 Dnyanprakash Vidyaniketan School, Latur
 Godavari Devi Kanya Vidyalay
 Global Knowledge Public School, Latur
 Jijamata Girls' School
 Rajasthan High School
 Shree Gujrathi English School G.S.S.
 Shri Keshavraj Vidyalaya, Latur
 Shri Bhagwan School, Latur
Mahatma Phule Madhyamik Vidyalaya, Ltur
Sane Guruji Prathmik Vidyalaya, Latur

 Swami Vivekanand Junior College, Latur
 Yeshwant Vidya Mandir, Sale Galli, Latur
 Yeshwant Vidyalaya

Colleges 
 Rajarshi Shahu College, Latur
 College of Computer Science and Information Technology
 Dayanand Arts College, Latur
 Dayanand Commerce College, Latur
 Dayanand Science College, Latur
 MIT College of Commerce & Management Studies
 MIMSR – CPS [PGD courses]
 MIMSR – D.M.L.T. Courses
 Maharashtra Institute of Physiotherapy
 MIT College of Science and Computer Studies
 Mahatma Basweshwar College Latur
 Reliance Latur Pattern, Shree Tripura College, Latur

ITI
 Government ITI, Latur
 Government Ladies ITI, Latur
 Government ITI for Backward Class, Latur
 Government ITI, Jalkot, Latur

Nursing colleges
 Dhanvantari Shikshan & Samajik Pratishthan, Sant Rambhau ANM School, Ahmedpur Dist - Latur
 Vishwabharati Senstha, Latur
 Abhinav Bahuddeshiya Sevabhavi Sanstha's New Vision School of Nursing, Latur
 Bhivrai Nursing School, Latur
 College of Nursing Latur
 Florence School of Nursing, Latur
 G.B.Patil School of Nursing, Udgir, Latur
 Indira Gandhi Nursing School, Barshi, Latur
 Indira Gandhi RANM Nursing School, Chakur, Latur
 Jawalge Nursing School, Latur
 Jijamata Nursing School, Latur
 Kalpataru Bahuuddeshiya Sevabhavi Sanstha's Latur School of Nursing, Latur
 Late Mahaling Swami Nursing School, Latur
 Latur Nursing School, Latur
 Maharashtra College of Nursing Majage Nagar, Latur
 Maharashtra Institute of Nursing Sciences - B.Sc. Nursing College
 Maharashtra Nursing School, Chakur
 Maharashtra College of Nursing (B.Sc. Nursing)
 Maharashtra School of Nursing (RGNM)
 Maharashtra College of Nursing (RANM)
 Matoshree Bahhuudeshiya Samajik Vikas Sanstha's Rashtramata Jijau Nursing School, Latur
 Matrubhoomi Nursing School, Udgir, Latur
 Mother Teresa Nursing Institute, Latur
 Navjeevan Institute of Nursing Sciences, Ahmedpur, Latur
 New Mothe Teresa RANM Nursing School, Udgir, Latur
 Parvatibai Patade Nursing School, Murud, Latur
 S.G. Nursing School, Latur
 Sant Rambhau ANM Nursing School, Latur
 Sarojini Naidu School of Nursing Chakur Latur
 Savitribai Phule Nursing Institute, Udgir, Latur
 Savitribai Phule Nursing School, Jalkot, Latur
 Shri Bhagwan Nursing School, Latur
 Suvidha Nursing, Latur
 Swami Vivekanand School of Nursing, Udgir, Latur
 Swami Vivekanand School of Nursing, Renapur
 Tirumalla RANM Nursing School, Latur
 Yeshwant Nursing School Latur

Engineering colleges
 Balaghat Engineering College, Rudha
 M. S. Bidve Engineering College, Latur
 Maharashtra College of Engineering, Nilanga
 Maharashtra Udayagiri Institute of Management & Technology, Somnathpur
 Vilasrao Deshmukh Foundations School of Technology Latur
 Vishveshwarayya Abhiyantriki Padvika Mahavidyalay, Almala, Ausa
 VIT Pune Latur Campus STMEI's Sandipani Technical Campus - Faculty of Engineering & Polytechnic, Kolpa, Latur

Pharmacy colleges
 Channabasweshwar Pharmacy College, Latur
 Mahatma Basveshwer Pharmacy College, Latur
 Dayanand College of Pharmacy, Latur
 Godavari Institute of Pharmacy, kolpa Latur
 Dagadojirao Deshmukh D Pharmacy College, Almala Tq Ausa Dist Latur
 Shivlingeshwar College of Pharmacy, Almala Tq Ausa Dist Latur

Polytechnic colleges
 Balghat Polytechnic College, Rudha
 Bharat Ratna Lata Mangeshkar Polytechnic Aurad Shahajani
 D.B Group of Institution, School of Technology (Polytechnic), Mahalangra
 Government Residential Women's Polytechnic, Latur
 Lal Bahadur Shastri Polytechnic Institute, Tondar Pati, Udgir
 N.B.S. Institute Of Polytechnic, Ausa, Latur
 Puranmal Lahoti Government Polytechnic, Latur
 Rajiv Gandhi Polytechnic, Kavalkhed, Udgir
 Rajiv Gandhi Institute of Polytechnic, Hasegaon
 Swami Vivekanand Institute of Polytechnic, Latur
 STMEI's Sandipani Technical Campus-Faculy of Polytechnic, Kolpa, Latur
 Vishveshwarayya Abhiyantriki Padvika Mahavidyalay, Almala, Ausa, Latur
 VDF School of Polytechnic, Latur

Medical colleges
 Government Medical College, Latur
 Vilasrao Deshmukh Government Institute of Medical Sciences, Latur
 Maharashtra Institute of Medical Science & Research, Latur

Veterinary, fishery and dairy colleges
 College of Dairy Technology, Udgir
 College of Fishery Science, Udgir
 College of Veterinary and Animal Sciences, Udgir

Ayurvedic colleges
 Manajara Ayurvedic Medical College & Hospital, Latur
 Dhanwantari Ayurvedic Medical College, Udgir

Dental colleges
 Maharashtra Institute of Dental Science & Research Latur

Management studies
 Aspiring Careers (English Speaking & Soft Skills Training Center), Latur
 D.B Institute of Management & Research, Mahalangra, Latur
 School of Management (SMT)
 Maitree Institute of Management, Latur

University sub-center
 S.R.T.M. University Sub Center Latur, Latur
 Maharshtra Animal and Fishery Sciences University, Nagpur, sub-center, Udgir

References

Education in Latur